Vinters is a surname. Notable people with the surname include:

Edgars Vinters (born 1919), Latvian painter
Jānis Vinters (born 1971), Latvian rally racing motorcycle rider and farmer

See also
 Vinter
 Vintner (winemaker)
 Winters (disambiguation)